Creighton is a city in Knox County, Nebraska, United States. The population was 1,154 at the 2010 census.

History
Creighton was platted in 1874. It was named in honor of John A. Creighton.

Geography
Creighton is located at  (42.465112, -97.907191).

Demographics

2010 census
At the 2010 census, there were 1,154 people, 538 households and 299 families living in the city. The racial makeup of the city was 97.1% White, 0.3% African American, 0.6% Native American, 0.3% Asian, 0.1% from other races, and 1.6% from two or more races. Hispanic or Latino of any race were 1.0% of the population.

There were 538 households, of which 23.8% had children under the age of 18 living with them, 43.7% were married couples living together, 8.0% had a female householder with no husband present, 3.9% had a male householder with no wife present, and 44.4% were non-families. 41.4% of all households were made up of individuals, and 25.7% had someone living alone who was 65 years of age or older. The average household size was 2.07 and the average family size was 2.83.

The median age was 47.7 years. 22.4% of residents were under the age of 18; 6% were between the ages of 18 and 24; 17.6% were from 25 to 44; 24% were from 45 to 64; and 30.2% were 65 years of age or older. The gender makeup was 44.9% male and 55.1% female.

2000 census
At the 2000 census, there were 1,270 people, 559 households and 342 families living in the city. The population density was 1,079.8 per square mile (415.6/km). There were 614 housing units at an average density of 522.0 per square mile (200.9/km). The racial makeup of the city was 98.11% White, 0.39% African American, 1.10% Native American, 0.08% Asian, 0.08% from other races, and 0.24% from two or more races. Hispanic or Latino of any race were 0.16% of the population.

There were 559 households, of which 24.9% had children under the age of 18 living with them, 53.5% were married couples living together, 5.7% had a female householder with no husband present, and 38.8% were non-families. 36.1% of all households were made up of individuals, and 22.2% had someone living alone who was 65 years of age or older. The average household size was 2.19 and the average family size was 2.87.

23.0% of the population were under the age of 18, 4.4% from 18 to 24, 21.3% from 25 to 44, 21.7% from 45 to 64, and 29.6% who were 65 years of age or older. The median age was 46 years. For every 100 females, there were 85.4 males. For every 100 females age 18 and over, there were 83.1 males.

The median household income was $27,763 and the median family income was $38,667. Males had a median income of $25,156 compared with $16,667 for females. The per capita income for the city was $15,293. About 7.4% of families and 10.1% of the population were below the poverty line, including 3.7% of those under age 18 and 13.1% of those age 65 or over.

Notable people
 Joseph G. Hanefeldt - Roman Catholic bishop
 Tony Wragge - American football lineman

Climate
This climatic region is typified by large seasonal temperature differences, with warm to hot (and often humid) summers and cold (sometimes severely cold) winters.  According to the Köppen Climate Classification system, Creighton has a humid continental climate, abbreviated "Dfa" on climate maps.

References

External links
 Official page.

Cities in Nebraska
Cities in Knox County, Nebraska
Creighton family